is a former Olympic alpine ski racer and silver medalist from Japan. He competed in three Winter Olympics (1952, 1956, 1960).

Ski racing
Born in Tomari, Kunashiri (ja), Hokkaidō, Igaya attended college in the United States at Dartmouth in New Hampshire, where he raced for the Big Green and graduated in 1957. "Chick"  won the U.S. national title in slalom in 1954 at Aspen, Colorado, and took a   third consecutive NCAA title in slalom, his sixth individual, in 1957 at Snowbasin, Utah.

At the Olympics in 1952, Igaya finished eleventh in the slalom, 20th in the giant slalom, and 24th in the downhill. Four years later in 1956, he won the silver medal in the slalom, was eleventh in the giant slalom, but did not finish in the downhill. All three events were won by Toni Sailer of Austria. At the 1960 Games, Igaya was twelfth in the slalom, 23rd in the giant slalom, and 34th in the downhill. Igaya also won a bronze medal in slalom at the World Championships in 1958, and finished fourth in the combined.

After racing
After graduation, Igaya worked in insurance, eventually becoming president of the Japanese branch of AIU Insurance Company. In parallel, he served as a sports administrator. Igaya was a member of the FIS alpine skiing committee and vice-president of the International Triathlon Union. He was a member of the International Olympic Committee from 1982 to 2012, becoming vice-president in 2005, and an honorary member in 2012. At the Winter Olympics in 2018, Igaya was inducted into the Olympians for Life project for giving back to sport.

World Championship results 

From 1948 through 1980, the Winter Olympics were also the World Championships for alpine skiing.
At the World Championships from 1954 through 1980, the combined was a "paper race" using the results of the three events (DH, GS, SL).

Olympic results

NCAA titles

Slalom (3): 1955, 1956, 1957
Alpine  (2): 1955, 1956
Downhill:1955

References

External links

 
 
Ivy League at 50 – Chiharu Igaya
Dartmouth College – Chiharu Igaya
U.S. Ski & Snowboard Hall of Fame – Chiharu Igaya

1931 births
Living people
Japanese male alpine skiers
Olympic alpine skiers of Japan
Alpine skiers at the 1952 Winter Olympics
Alpine skiers at the 1956 Winter Olympics
Alpine skiers at the 1960 Winter Olympics
Olympic silver medalists for Japan
People from Hokkaido
People from Sakhalin Oblast
Olympic medalists in alpine skiing
International Olympic Committee members
Medalists at the 1956 Winter Olympics
Dartmouth Big Green skiers
20th-century Japanese people
21st-century Japanese people